The 1995–96 Northern Illinois Huskies men's basketball team represented Northern Illinois University in the college basketball season of 1995–96. The team, led by head coached by Brian Hammel, were members of the Midwestern Collegiate Conference and played their homes game at the Chick Evans Field House. They finished the season 20–10, 10–6 in MCC play; won the 1996 MCC men's basketball tournament and lost in the first round of the 1996 NCAA tournament.

Roster

Northern Illinois Huskies men's basketball seasons
Northern Illinois
Northern Illinois Huskies men's basketball
Northern Illinois Huskies men's basketball
Northern Illinois